The 2021 Kite Awards (Vietnamese: Giải Cánh diều 2021) is the 29th edition of Vietnam Cinema Association Awards, also the 20th edition since the award is officially named Kite. It honored the best in Vietnam film, television works of 2021.

Due to the prolonged effects of the COVID-19 epidemic, the Association had not be able to hold the 2020 Kite Award ceremony until December 2021. That causes the time to hold the 2021 Kite Awards ceremony to be postponed to mid-2022 instead of March as tradition.

This year, a total of 147 works participated in the award, including: 12 feature films, 14 TV drama series, 45 documentaries, 10 science films, 28 animated films, 35 short films and 3 film studies.

On September 13, the winners are announced. In the feature film category, The Brilliant Darkness! won the most with 5 included Golden Kite, Red Dawn also won 5 along with a promising acting award. Meanwhile, 11 Months 5 Days and Cherish the Sunny Day - Part 1 - are both awarded Golden Kite for television films.

Winner and nominees 
Winners are listed first, highlighted in boldface, with a dagger indicating the shortlist nominees for the Golden Kite.
Highlighted title indicates Golden Kite for the Best Film/Drama/Study winner(s).
Highlighted title indicates Silver Kite for the Second Best Film/Drama/Study winner(s).
Highlighted title indicates Film/Drama/Study(s) received the Certificate of Merit.
Other nominees

Feature film

Multiple wins 
The following films received multiple wins:

Television film

Multiple wins 
The following films received multiple wins:

Animated film

Multiple wins 
The following films received multiple wins:

Documentary film

Multiple wins 
The following films received multiple wins:

Science film

Multiple wins 
The following films received multiple wins:

Short film

Film critic/theory research

Ceremony

Presenters 
The following individuals presented awards at the ceremony:
MC Hồng Phúc and MC Thụy Vân with Golden Kite for Best Film critic/theory research works
Singer/actress Minh Hằng and actor Trần Bảo Sơn with Best Works and Individuals - Documentary film & Science film
Actresses Lan Phương, Lương Thu Trang, Puka and singer/actor Gin Tuấn Kiệt with Best Supporting Actress/Actor - Television & Feature film, Promising Actress
Actress/singer Trương Quỳnh Anh and her son, actor Hiếu Hiền, actress Mai Thanh Hà with Best Works and Individuals - Animated film & Short film
Actress Việt Hương and actor Doãn Quốc Đam with Best Screenplay, Best Director and Best Cinematography - Television film
Actor Quyền Linh and singer Hà Phương with Best Leading Actor/Actress - Television film
Actor Quyền Linh with Nominees of Golden Kite for Best Television Film
Actress Trương Ngọc Ánh and actor Minh Luân with Golden Kite for Best Drama
Models Phan Thị Mơ, Mạnh Lân and Nguyễn Huỳnh Kim Duyên with Best Cinematography, Best Art Design, Best Original Score and Best Sound - Feature film
Actor Việt Anh and actress Quỳnh Nga with Best Leading Actress/Actor & Best Screenplay - Feature film
Actor Mạnh Cường and actress Mai Thu Huyền with Best Director - Feature film
Actress Trà Giang and actor/director Đào Bá Sơn with Golden Kite for Best Feature film

Performers 
The following individuals performed at the ceremony:
Opening Medley: Singer Thủy Anh with the song Nhớ mùa thu Hà Nội, Đình Văn with the song Thành phố tôi yêu, Hoài Thương with the song Nha Trang mùa thu lại về
Singer Nhật Kim Anh with the song Simple
Giang Brothers with a circus performance
Singer Hà Phương with the song Quen với cô đơn

See also 
 22nd Vietnam Film Festival
 2021 VTV Awards

References

External links
Thế Giới Điện Ảnh Online – Official Vietnam Cinema Association Magazine 

Vietnamese film awards
Kite Awards
Kite Awards
2021 in Vietnam
2021 in Vietnamese television